Hector George Joseph Goudreau  (born October 11, 1950) is a politician from Alberta, Canada.  He is originally from the francophone area of Beaumont, Alberta, located just south of Edmonton's metro population.

Hector is a former member of the Legislative Assembly of Alberta, having been elected for 2 terms as an MLA for the Progressive Conservatives. In the 2004 Alberta general election Hector narrowly hung on to his seat defeating Dale Lueken from the Alberta Alliance Party in one of the closest election battles outside of the Edmonton region.

On December 15, 2006, Hector Goudreau became Minister of Tourism, Parks, Recreation and Culture under newly elected Premier Ed Stelmach. After the election of 2008, Goudreau was named the Minister of Employment and Immigration.  After Alison Redford became Premier in October 2011, Goudreau was shuffled out of Cabinet in his role as Minister of Municipal Affairs and replaced by fellow PC MLA Doug Griffiths.

Goudreau has three daughters: Micheline, Monique and Melanie. He lives in Falher with his wife Angeline.

Controversy
In March 2012, Hector Goudreau received criticism after CBC News obtained a letter written by Goudreau warning a northern Alberta school division that it could lose further funding if it continued publicizing their school funding problems.  Goudreau sent subsequent letters to the school division apologizing and later stepped down from his position as chair of the Cabinet Policy Committee on Community Development.

References

External links
Legislative Assembly of Alberta. Hector Goudreau biography

1950 births
Living people
Franco-Albertan people
Progressive Conservative Association of Alberta MLAs
Members of the Executive Council of Alberta
21st-century Canadian politicians